The Billboard Latin Pop Airplay chart ranks the best-performing Spanish-language pop music singles in the United States. Published by Billboard, the data are compiled by Nielsen SoundScan based collectively on each single's weekly airplay based on audience impressions.

Chart history

See also
List of number-one Billboard Latin Pop Albums of 2009
List of number-one Billboard Hot Latin Songs of 2009

References

United States Latin Pop Airplay
2009
2009 in Latin music